Phrangki Buam (born 16 December 2000) is an Indian professional footballer who plays as a winger for I-League club Real Kashmir.

Career

Early career
Born in Meghalaya, Buam began his career in his home state with Wahingdoh FC
which competes in Shilong Premier League.He soon joined the youth side of Shillong Lajong , playing for the club in the Shillong Premier League. Buam is currently pursuing education, sociology and Khasi language in his Bachelor of Arts course at Shillong College.

Shillong Lajong
Phrangki Buam started his I-League career with Shillong Lajong in 2018. Buam was the second highest goal scorer by an Indian Player in the I-League 2018/19 season. He won Meghalaya State League and Shillong Premier League with Shillong Lajong FC in 2019-20 season and also was the Shillong Lajong's highest goal scorer with 24 goals in both tournaments.

Bengaluru United
Phrangki Buam joined FC Bengaluru United  on loan from Shillong Lajong on 22 January 2020.

FC Goa
On 17 September 2020 , Phrangki Buam joined FC Goa on a three year deal from Shillong Lajong.

Mohammedan Sporting
Bhum moved to I-League side Mohammedan Sporting on loan and was part of the team's 2021 Durand Cup campaign, and reached to the final, defeating FC Bengaluru United 4–2. On 3 October 2021, they lost the title winning match 1–0 to ISL side FC Goa.

Career statistics

Club

Honours

Club
Mohammedan Sporting
Calcutta Football League: 2021

Individual
2018–19 I-League Best Young Player

References

External links
 

Living people
2000 births
Indian footballers
Shillong Lajong FC players
FC Bengaluru United players
FC Goa players
Association football midfielders
Footballers from Meghalaya
Indian Super League players
I-League players